Arthur Lee Gilliard (July 24, 1887 – December 28, 1950) was an American Negro league pitcher between 1909 and 1914.

A native of Opelika, Alabama, Gilliard attended Talladega College. He made his Negro leagues debut in 1909 with the Birmingham Giants, and went on to play for several teams through 1914. Gilliard died in his hometown of Opelika in 1950 at age 63.

References

External links
Baseball statistics and player information from Baseball-Reference Black Baseball Stats and Seamheads

1887 births
1950 deaths
Birmingham Giants players
Chicago American Giants players
French Lick Plutos players
Louisville White Sox players
Oklahoma Monarchs players
St. Louis Giants players
Baseball pitchers
Baseball players from Alabama
People from Opelika, Alabama
20th-century African-American people